Torarica is the original capital of Suriname. It was settled by Portuguese Jews in 1629. One origin offered for its name is as a Portuguese coinage meaning "Opulent Torah". The Portuguese Jews arrived via Holland and Brazil. By 1665, the village of Paramaribo was expanded and quickly outranked Torarica.

The name Torarica is still in use by the Torarica Group. One of its hotels, the Torarica Resort, as well as the village, and former sugar plantation La Simplicité are located near Torarica.

See also
Jodensavanne

References

Historic Jewish communities in South America
History of Suriname
Jewish Surinamese history
Populated places in Para District
Brazilian-Jewish diaspora
Dutch-Jewish diaspora
Portuguese-Jewish diaspora
Portuguese diaspora in South America